CLG Naomh Muire is a Gaelic football only GAA club based in Mullaghderg, County Donegal, Ireland, and serves the lower Rosses area. The club fields both men's and ladies' teams at underage to senior level.

As of 2022, the club competes in the Donegal Intermediate Championship.

History
The club was formed in 1980.

Tony Doherty (Antóin Ó Dochartaigh) of Rann na Feirste was a co-founder. Ó Dochartaigh also acted as field liner, kit man, referee, linesman and trainer at various stages and also served as secretary and treasurer of the club. He led the vote to acquire floodlights for the club's facilities.

Naomh Muire have twice won the All-Ireland Comórtas Peile na Gaeltachta, in 2007 and 2011.

The club won the 2013 Donegal Intermediate Football Championship, defeating St Naul's in the final.

Jack O'Brien played for Donegal in the 2016 National Football League semi-final against Dublin at Croke Park.

Managers

Honours
 All-Ireland Junior Gaeltacht Championship (2): 2007, 2011
 Donegal Intermediate Football Championship (3): 1994, 1998, 2013
 Donegal Junior Football Championship (2): 1991, 2007

References

Gaelic football clubs in County Donegal
Gaelic games clubs in County Donegal
The Rosses